PS Publishing is an independent book publisher based in Hornsea, UK.

Background
PS Publishing was founded in 1999 by Peter Crowther.  They specialise in novella length fiction (20,000 to 40,000 words) from the fantasy, science fiction and horror genres. It has won what The Guardian calls the "prestigious" World Fantasy Award nine times in the categories of Single-Author Collection (for The Very Best of Gene Wolfe, published 2010; Bibliomancy, 2003; and Where Furnaces Burn, 2012), Anthology (Exotic Gothic 4, 2012), Long Fiction (The Unlicensed Magician, 2015), Novel (Illyria, 2007;  Osama, 2011), and in the category "Special Award, Professional."

Since June 2004 it has also published the quarterly magazine Postscripts. Since 2012, PS is the publisher of the Exotic Gothic series, edited by Danel Olson. They have also launched the Electric Dreamhouse imprint.

Notable books published by PS Publishing include 20th Century Ghosts by Joe Hill.

References

External links
PS Publishing website
PS Publishing at the Internet Speculative Fiction Database

British speculative fiction publishers
Small press publishing companies
Horror book publishing companies
Science fiction publishers
Publishing companies established in 1999
British companies established in 1999